Gordon "Gord" Fraser (born November 19, 1968) is a Canadian former professional road racing cyclist. As a rider he specialised in sprinting. 

Fraser is a three-time Olympian and four-time Commonwealth Games participant and has over 200 career wins including becoming the 2004 Canadian national road race champion. He also rode in the 1997 Tour de France and won the US National Race Calendar series twice. He retired from professional cycling at the end of the 2006 season after racing four seasons for the Health Net Pro Cycling Team Presented by Maxxis. 

He went on to be a directeur sportif with Team Type 1 in 2009, and in 2010 joined UnitedHealthcare-Maxxis as a directeur sportif. In 2011 became DS for the US Continental team, Realcyclist.com. Whilst there he guided Francisco Mancebo to the top of the National Race Calendar individual standings in 2011 and again in 2012 (under the team's new name of Competitive Cyclist Racing Team). However he left the team when it merged with Kenda-5 Hour Energy ahead of the 2013 season. After it emerged that Silber would disband at the end of the 2018 season, Floyd Landis announced that Fraser would serve as manager of his new UCI Continental team, Floyd's of Leadville. After leaving the scene for two years, Fraser was announced to become the head directeur sportif of the  team for the 2022 season, replacing Zak Dempster.

Fraser resides in Tucson, Arizona and has two sons named Angus and Axel.

Major results

1992
 1st Stage 5 Niederösterreich Rundfahrt
1994
 1st Paris–Troyes
 1st Paris–Chauny
 1st Stages 2, 4 & 5 Tour de Normandie
 1st Stages 2 & 5 Tour du Vaucluse
1995
 5th Trofeo Luis Puig
1997
 1st Stage 4 Grand Prix du Midi Libre
 5th Paris–Mantes
 10th Le Samyn
1998
 1st Stage 2 Vuelta a Asturias
 1st Stages 1 & 4 Redlands Bicycle Classic
 1st Stage 1 Killington Stage Race
 1st Stage 1 Tour de Beauce
 1st Stage 4 Tour de Toona
 2nd Overall Sea Otter Classic
1999
 1st Overall Tucson Bicycle Classic
1st Stages 1 & 2
 Tour Trans Canada
1st Stages 2, 3, 6, 8 & 9
1st Points classification
 1st Stages 3 & 5 Redlands Bicycle Classic
 1st Stages 2 & 7 International Cycling Classic
 1st Stage 5 Tour de Beauce
 1st Stage 4 Tour de Toona
 1st Stage 2 Fitchburg Longsjo Classic
 2nd  Road race, Pan American Games
 2nd  Road race, Pan American Road Championships
 2nd Overall Sea Otter Classic
 3rd Athens Twilight Criterium
 7th First Union Classic
2000
 1st Athens Twilight Criterium
 1st GP de la Ville de Rennes
 1st Stage 1 Critérium International
 1st Overall Valley of the Sun Stage Race
1st Stages 1 & 3
 1st Overall Tour de Toona
1st Stages 1, 2, 3 & 4
 1st Prologue & Stage 3 Sea Otter Classic
 2nd Road race, National Road Championships
 2nd First Union Classic
 8th Philadelphia International Cycling Classic
2001
 1st Stage 1 Tour de Langkawi
 1st Stage 2 Tour de Beauce
 1st Stage 2 Redlands Bicycle Classic
 1st Prologue & Stage 3 Tour de Toona
 2nd Clarendon Cup
2002
 1st First Union Classic
 1st Overall Tucson Bicycle Classic
1st Stages 1, 2 & 3
 1st Athens Twilight Criterium
 1st Manhattan Beach Grand Prix
 1st Stage 1 Valley of the Sun Stage Race
 1st Stage 2 Sea Otter Classic
 1st Stage 6b Tour de Beauce
 3rd Overall USA Cycling National Racing Calendar
2003
 1st Gastown Grand Prix
 1st Stages 1 & 3 Tour of the Gila
 1st Stage 3 Tour de Beauce
 1st Stage 1 Tucson Bicycle Classic
 1st Stage 1 Redlands Bicycle Classic
 1st Stages 2, 3 & 4 Pomona Valley Stage Race
 3rd Manhattan Beach Grand Prix
2004
 1st  Road race, National Road Championships
 1st Stages 1 & 7 Tour de Georgia
 1st  Points classification, Tour de Langkawi
 1st Stage 4 Cascade Cycling Classic
 2nd Overall USA Cycling National Racing Calendar
 2nd CSC Invitational
 2nd Wachovia Classic
 3rd Philadelphia International Championship
2005
 1st Wachovia Classic
 1st Gastown Grand Prix
 1st Stage 6 Tour de Georgia
 1st 
 1st Stage 1 Cascade Cycling Classic
 1st Stage 4 Nature Valley Grand Prix
 2nd Overall San Dimas Stage Race
1st Stage 2
 2nd Overall Sea Otter Classic
1st Stage 2
 3rd Overall Tour de Delta
1st Stage 3
2006
 1st  Overall Joe Martin Stage Race
1st Stages 1, 2 & 4
 1st 
 1st Stage 3 Tour of the Gila
 1st Stage 3 Tour de Delta
 1st Stage 3 Central Valley Classic
 3rd Overall Tour of Elk Grove
 3rd Athens Twilight Criterium

References

External links

Interview on Cycling News
Interview on BMC
Interview on Canoe
2005 Pezcyclingnews interview of Gord Fraser  by Matt Wood

Canadian male cyclists
1968 births
Living people
Cyclists at the 1996 Summer Olympics
Cyclists at the 1999 Pan American Games
Cyclists at the 2000 Summer Olympics
Cyclists at the 2004 Summer Olympics
Olympic cyclists of Canada
Sportspeople from Ottawa
Pan American Games medalists in cycling
Pan American Games silver medalists for Canada
Medalists at the 1999 Pan American Games